Qaleh Hammam-e Hajji Rasul (also Romanized as Qal‘eh Ḩammām-e Ḩājjī Rasūl; also known as Qal‘eh Ḩammām-e Ḩājj Rasūl, Hamāmi, Qal‘eh Ḩammām, Qal‘eh-ye Ḩammām, and Qal‘eh-ye Ḩammām Rasūl) is a village in Bagh-e Keshmir Rural District, Salehabad County, Razavi Khorasan Province, Iran. At the 2006 census, its population was 330, in 66 families.

References 

Populated places in   Torbat-e Jam County